(lit. "Saba Doll") is a Japanese television drama series broadcast on TV Tokyo starring AKB48's Mayu Watanabe. The story revolves around the 38-year-old Usa Shijimi (Watanabe), who is a high school classical literature teacher. Her students are mean to her, but they do not realize that she has another identity. Outside of school, she lies about her age to be active as the super popular 17-year-old idol Watanabe Mayu, whom the students adore. The show aired on TV Tokyo on Fridays starting from January 13, 2012 to April 7, 2012 with 12 episodes. After the show ended the series was turned into a manga drawn by Akihiro Nakamura and published in Kodansha's Weekly Young Magazine over three volumes in 2012.

Notes 

References 

2012 Japanese television series debuts
2012 Japanese television series endings
Japanese drama television series
TV Tokyo original programming
Yasushi Akimoto